4-methylaminobutanoate oxidase (methylamine-forming) (mao (gene)) is an enzyme with systematic name 4-methylaminobutanoate methylamidohydrolase. This enzyme catalyses the following chemical reaction

 4-methylaminobutanoate + O2 + H2O  succinate semialdehyde + methylamine + H2O2

The enzyme participates in the nicotine degradation in soil bacterium Arthrobacter nicotinovorans.

References

External links 
 

EC 1.5.3